The 1979 Dutch Open was a Grand Prix tennis tournament staged in Hilversum, Netherlands. The tournament was played on outdoor clay courts and was held from July 23 to July 29, 1979. It was the 23rd edition of the tournament. Balázs Taróczy won the singles title.

Finals

Singles
 Balázs Taróczy defeated  Tomáš Šmíd 6–2, 6–2, 6–1

Doubles
 Tom Okker /  Balázs Taróczy defeated  Jan Kodeš /  Tomáš Šmíd 6–1, 6–3

References

External links
 ITF tournament edition details

Dutch Open (tennis)
Dutch Open (tennis)
Dutch Open
Dutch Open (tennis), 1979
Dutch Open